is a senior high school operated by the Tokyo Metropolitan Board of Education, located in Den Enchōfu Minami, Ōta, Tokyo.

References

External links
  

Tokyo Metropolitan Government Board of Education schools
High schools in Tokyo
Ōta, Tokyo